Ernest Phypers (13 September 1910 – 1960) was an English professional footballer who played for Walthamstow Avenue, Aston Villa, Tottenham Hotspur, Northfleet United and Doncaster Rovers.

Football career 
Phypers began his career at non-league club Walthamstow Avenue. The wing half joined Aston Villa as an amateur in September 1932 before Tottenham Hotspur offered him a contract in May, 1933. Phypers went on to play for the "Spurs" nursery club Northfleet United  until he signed professional forms for Tottenham in June, 1934. He played a total of 33 matches in all competitions for the "Lilywhites" between 1934 and 1936. After leaving White Hart Lane Phypers signed for Doncaster Rovers and made a further three appearances. During World War II he made guest appearances for Clapton Orient, Southend United and West Ham United.

References 

1910 births
1960 deaths
People from Walthamstow
English footballers
Association football wing halves
English Football League players
Walthamstow Avenue F.C. players
Aston Villa F.C. players
Northfleet United F.C. players
Tottenham Hotspur F.C. players
Doncaster Rovers F.C. players
West Ham United F.C. wartime guest players
Clapton Orient F.C. wartime guest players